Major Christopher Reynolds Stone, D.S.O., M.C. (19 September 1882 – 22 May 1965) was the first disc jockey in the United Kingdom.

He was the youngest son of Eton College's assistant master and Stonehouse preparatory school's founder Edward Daniel Stone. Christopher Stone was educated at Eton and served in the Royal Fusiliers. In 1906 Stone published a book of sea songs and ballads and in 1923 he wrote the history of his old regiment. He became the London editor of The Gramophone, a magazine started by his brother-in-law Compton Mackenzie.

Stone approached the BBC himself with the idea for a record programme, which the corporation initially dismissed. Stone managed to convince them though and on 7 July 1927 he started playing records on air. His relaxed, conversational style was exceptional at a time when most of the BBC's presentation was extremely formal, and his programmes became highly popular as a result. He wore a dinner jacket and tie when he presented.

In 1934 Stone joined the commercial station Radio Luxembourg (for 5,000 pounds a year) and was barred by the BBC in consequence.   He wrote a column reviewing new popular records for the Sunday Referee newspaper and appeared in advertisements for Bush radio sets.  In 1937, as "Uncle Chris", he presented the first daily children's programme on commercial radio, Kiddies Quarter Hour on Radio Lyons. Stone later rejoined the BBC and caused a major row in 1941. On 11 November he wished King Victor Emmanuel of Italy a happy birthday on air, adding "I don't think any of us wish him anything but good, poor soul." This good wish towards the head of a state with which Britain was at war at the time led to the sacking of the BBC's Senior Controller of Programmes and tighter government control over all broadcasts.

Stone was an avid record collector; in the mid-1930s he already owned over 12,000. When he turned 75 in 1957 the magazine Melody Maker praised his pioneering work: "Everyone who has written, produced or compered a gramophone programme should salute the founder of his trade."

Bibliography
Sea songs and ballads, 1906
A History of the 22nd (service) battalion, Royal fusiliers (Kensington), 1923
From Vimy Ridge to the Rhine: The Great War Letters of Christopher Stone, D.S.O., M.C., 1989

See also

 Eton College
 BBC

1882 births
1965 deaths
BBC people
British radio DJs
Royal Fusiliers officers
People educated at Eton College
Radio Luxembourg (English) presenters
Place of birth missing